Sedco Hills is the informal/local name for a southern section of the Temescal Mountains, located in southwestern Riverside County, California.

They were named after the town of Sedco Hills, located on their west side and now part of the city of Wildomar. The placename Sedco was introduced by the South Elsinore Development Company, that subdivided and sold the land on the southeast side of the lake.

Geography
The hills lie southeast of Lake Elsinore and the city of Lake Elsinore, south of the San Jacinto River and Canyon Lake reservoir, west of Cottonwood Canyon, and north of Bundy Canyon.

The highest elevation of the hills is  Wildomar Peak at the south end of the range, overlooking Bundy Canyon.

References 

Temescal Mountains
Mountain ranges of Riverside County, California
Peninsular Ranges
Lake Elsinore, California
Hills of California